The Results of the 2008 presidential primaries are subdivided into:

Results of the 2008 Democratic Party presidential primaries
Results of the 2008 Republican Party presidential primaries

de:Vorwahlergebnisse der Präsidentschaftswahl in den Vereinigten Staaten 2008
sv:Resultat i primärvalen till presidentvalet i USA 2008